Scott Lynch (born April 2, 1978) is an American fantasy author who wrote the Gentleman Bastard Sequence series of novels. His first novel, The Lies of Locke Lamora, was purchased by Orion Books in August 2004 and published in June 2006 under the Gollancz imprint in the United Kingdom and under the Bantam imprint in the United States. The next two novels in the series, Red Seas Under Red Skies and The Republic of Thieves, were published in 2007 and 2013, respectively.

Career 
Lynch's debut novel, The Lies of Locke Lamora, was a World Fantasy Award finalist in 2007. In 2007 and 2008 Lynch was nominated for the John W. Campbell Award for Best New Writer.

Lynch received the Sydney J. Bounds Best Newcomer Award from the British Fantasy Society in 2008.

Biography 
Lynch was born in St. Paul, Minnesota on April 2, 1978 and was the first of three brothers. He spent his early life in the Minneapolis/St. Paul area. In 2004, he moved to New Richmond, Wisconsin, and in 2016 he moved to Massachusetts.

The Lies of Locke Lamora, Lynch's first novel, was bought by Simon Spanton at Orion Books in August, 2004 and published in June, 2006. Prior to that he worked at different jobs: dishwasher, busboy, waiter, web designer, office manager, prep cook, and freelance writer.

Lynch's second novel, Red Seas Under Red Skies, was published in 2007, and his third, The Republic of Thieves, was published in 2013. They, together with the forthcoming The Thorn of Emberlain and its sequels, comprise the Gentleman Bastard Sequence.

Lynch is very much your standard-issue geek-of-all-trades; he likes history, literature, films, beige box-era Mac stuff, gaming, and game design. He collects old Choose Your Own Adventure novels and Infocom text adventure games. He also has a background in firefighting and emergency services. He was initially trained and certified as a firefighter at Anoka Technical College in Minnesota in 2005, and from 2005–2016 he was a paid-on-call firefighter for the city of New Richmond, Wisconsin.

Lynch married his first wife, Jenny, in August 2006; they divorced in April 2010. In October 2016 he married Elizabeth Bear, a fellow fantasy writer.

Books

Gentleman Bastard Sequence  
 The Lies of Locke Lamora (June 27, 2006)
 Red Seas Under Red Skies (June 20, 2007)
 The Republic of Thieves (October 8, 2013)
 The Thorn of Emberlain (forthcoming)
 The Ministry of Necessity (forthcoming)
 The Mage and the Master Spy (forthcoming)
 Inherit the Night (forthcoming)

The series takes place in the world of the shattered Therin Throne Empire and its successor states. It follows the life of the young professional thief and con artist Locke Lamora, over a period of some fifteen to twenty years. Lynch has stated that there will be a sequel series set twenty years after with new protagonists, which will also be seven books long.

The world described has a society and technology roughly similar to that of the historical 16th or 17th century, but with several crucial differences: the world is littered with "Elderglass", an unbreakable material left behind by mysterious beings known as "Eldren"; firearms have not been discovered, the crossbow being the most advanced offensive weapon known; magic exists, virtually monopolized by the secretive and malevolent Bondsmagi; the practice of alchemy offers some devices far beyond 17th century levels, such as alchemical lights which are the equivalent of electric ones. Though the society depicted is far from egalitarian, and there is an enormous gap between rich and poor, it does have very considerable gender equality. Similar to present-day Western society—and very different from historical 17th century societies—women in this world can and do have jobs and careers, on both the bottom and the top of society. Within a few chapters of Red Seas Under Red Skies the (male) protagonists encounter female dock workers, female carpenters, female assassins, female captains of both naval and pirate ships, and women in various other positions.

Lynch has described each novel of the series as "[covering] what you might call a different general situation" with "the same characters getting into trouble but the backdrop changes."

Queen of the Iron Sands
In August 2009 Lynch began to publish the online novel Queen of the Iron Sands, a planetary romance, in the style of Edgar Rice Burroughs' Barsoom novels. The story concerns a female aviator and ex-WASP who is transported to a fantastic Mars. Chapters were scheduled to be released weekly. The serialization ran until September 2009 and picked up in June 2010 and halted again in September 2012.

Selected awards and honors

References

External links

 
 
 Reviews at Fantasy Literature
 
 Scott Lynch biography on Fantasy Book Review

Interviews
Interview by Alison Bone for The Bookseller, 10 April 2006
Interview  by Jay Tomio, May 27, 2006
Interview by Pat's Fantasy Hotlist, 21 June 2006
Video Interview on YouTube, 21 July 2006
Interview by Elbakin.net, 7 August 2006
Interview by Katharine Stubbs for Shades of Sentience (sentientonline.net), 21 September 2009
Interview by Fantasy-Faction, 16 September 2011
Interview by Audible, 30 November 2016

Living people
21st-century American novelists
American fantasy writers
American male novelists
Writers from Saint Paul, Minnesota
People from New Richmond, Wisconsin
Novelists from Wisconsin
1978 births
21st-century American male writers
Novelists from Minnesota